Hiltrud Kier (née Arnetzl; born 30 June 1937) is an Austrian art historian and academic. She was city conservator to Cologne and Director General of the city's museums, with her term including the Year of Romanesque Churches in 1985. She popularised the preservation of monuments and was committed to 1950s buildings.

Publications
Works by Hiltrud Kier:
 Der mittelalterliche Schmuckfussboden unter besonderer Berücksichtigung des Rheinlandes, 1970
 Schmuckfussböden in Renaissance und Barock, 1976
 Die Kölner Neustadt: Planung, Entstehung, Nutzung, 1978
 Die romanischen Kirchen in Köln, 1985
 Lust und Verlust: Kölner Sammler zwischen Trikolore und Preussenadler, 1995

References

 Birgit Aldenhoff, Martin Bredenbeck et al. (Hrsg.): Denkmalpflege – Städtebau. Beiträge zum 70. Geburtstag von Hiltrud Kier. J. P. Bachem, Köln 2008, S. 137–138. 
 "Weg mit Schaden. Köln sinkt weiter: Aus für Generaldirektorin Hiltrud Kier", in: Frankfurter Allgemeine Zeitung 23 August 1993. Thomas Fechner-Smarsly: Das Portrait: Hiltrud Kier, in: taz, 27 August 1993. Jürgen Raap: Köln ohne Kier, Kunstforum international 124, 1993, S. 508. 
 Helmut Haumann: "Der Förderverein Romanische Kirchen. Eine Erfolgsgeschichte". In: Denkmalpflege – Städtebau. Beiträge zum 70. Geburtstag von Hiltrud Kier. J. P. Bachem, Köln 2008, S. 62. 
 Henriette Meynen: "Laudatio zu Ehren von Hiltrud Kier". In: Denkmalpflege – Städtebau. Beiträge zum 70. Geburtstag von Hiltrud Kier. J. P. Bachem, Köln 2008, S. 24.  
 Westdeutscher Rundfunk, WDR 3, Kulturnachrichten 28 August 2013: Rheinlandtaler für ehemalige Kölner Stadtkonservatorin. (Memento 9 January 2014 im Internet Archive),

External links 
 
 Schriftenverzeichnis auf der Homepage der Rheinischen Friedrich-Wilhelms Universität Bonn  
 Westdeutscher Rundfunk, WDR 5, Erlebte Geschichten 14 September 2008 (Autorin: Ursula Deutschendorf):Balance zwischen Tradition und Moderne. Hiltrud Kier, ehemalige Stadtkonservatorin. (retrieved 26 June 2017)  
 Kölner Stadt-Anzeiger 27 June 2017: "Man muss schon Biss haben in Köln", von Martin Oehlen  
 Kölnische Rundschau 29 June 2017: Interview Hiltrud Kier, frühere Generaldirektorin der Museen, wird 80 Jahre alt, im Gespräch mit Martina Windrath  
 "Wir hatten den Mund zu halten", von Martin Oehlen, in: Kölner Stadt-Anzeiger Nr. 67 20 March 2018 Seite 21 Kultur  

1937 births
Living people
Austrian women academics
Austrian art historians
Women art historians
20th-century Austrian historians